Stoney Creek Township may refer to:
 Stoney Creek Township, Caswell County, North Carolina, in Caswell County, North Carolina
 Stoney Creek Township, Wayne County, North Carolina, in Wayne County, North Carolina

See also
 Stonycreek Township (disambiguation)
 Stoney Creek (disambiguation)

Township name disambiguation pages